The Heck reaction (also called the Mizoroki–Heck reaction) is the chemical reaction of an unsaturated halide (or triflate) with an alkene in the presence of a base and a palladium catalyst  to form a substituted alkene. It is named after Tsutomu Mizoroki and Richard F. Heck. Heck was awarded the 2010 Nobel Prize in Chemistry, which he shared with Ei-ichi Negishi and Akira Suzuki, for the discovery and development of this reaction. This reaction was the first example of a carbon-carbon bond-forming reaction that followed a Pd(0)/Pd(II) catalytic cycle, the same catalytic cycle that is seen in other Pd(0)-catalyzed cross-coupling reactions. The Heck reaction is a way to substitute alkenes.

History
The original reaction by Tsutomu Mizoroki (1971) describes the coupling between iodobenzene and styrene in methanol to form stilbene at 120 °C (autoclave) with potassium acetate base and palladium chloride catalysis. This work was an extension of earlier work by Fujiwara (1967) on the Pd(II)-mediated coupling of arenes (Ar–H) and alkenes and earlier work by Heck (1969) on the coupling of arylmercuric halides (ArHgCl) with alkenes using a stoichiometric amount of a palladium(II) species.

In 1972 Heck acknowledged the Mizoroki publication and detailed independently discovered work. Heck's reaction conditions differ in terms of the catalyst (palladium acetate), catalyst loading (0.01 eq.), base (hindered amine), and absence of solvent.

In 1974 Heck showed that phosphine ligands facilitated the reaction.

Catalyst and substrates
The reaction is catalyzed by palladium complexes. Typical catalysts and precatalysts include tetrakis(triphenylphosphine)palladium(0), palladium chloride, and palladium(II) acetate. Typical supporting ligands are triphenylphosphine, PHOX, and BINAP. Typical bases are triethylamine, potassium carbonate, and sodium acetate.

The aryl electrophile can be a halide (Br, Cl) or a triflate as well as benzyl or vinyl halides. The alkene must contain at least one sp2-C-H bond. Electron-withdrawing substituents enhance the reaction, thus acrylates are ideal.

Reaction mechanism 
The mechanism of this vinylation involves organopalladium intermediates. The required palladium(0) compound is often generated in situ from a palladium(II) precursor.

For instance, palladium(II) acetate is reduced by triphenylphosphine to bis(triphenylphosphine)palladium(0) (1) concomitant with oxidation of triphenylphosphine to triphenylphosphine oxide. Step A is an oxidative addition in which palladium inserts itself in the aryl-bromide bond. The resulting palladium(II) complex then binds alkene (3). In step B the alkene inserts into the Pd-C bond in a syn addition step. Step C involves a beta-hydride elimination (here the arrows are showing the opposite) with the formation of a new palladium - alkene π complex (5). This complex is destroyed in the next step. The Pd(0) complex is regenerated by reductive elimination of the palladium(II) compound by potassium carbonate in the final step, D. In the course of the reaction the carbonate is stoichiometrically consumed and palladium is truly a catalyst and used in catalytic amounts. A similar palladium cycle but with different scenes and actors is observed in the Wacker process.

This cycle is not limited to vinyl compounds, in the Sonogashira coupling one of the reactants is an alkyne and in the Suzuki coupling the alkene is replaced by an aryl boronic acid and in the Stille reaction by an aryl stannane. The cycle also extends to the other group 10 element nickel for example in the Negishi coupling between aryl halides and organozinc compounds. Platinum forms strong bonds with carbon and does not have a catalytic activity in this type of reaction.

Stereoselectivity
This coupling reaction is stereoselective with a propensity for trans coupling as the palladium halide group and the bulky organic residue move away from each other in the reaction sequence in a rotation step. The Heck reaction is applied industrially in the production of naproxen and the sunscreen component octyl methoxycinnamate.  The naproxen synthesis includes a coupling between a brominated naphthalene compound with ethylene:

Variations

Ionic liquid Heck reaction
In the presence of an ionic liquid a Heck reaction proceeds in absence of a phosphorus ligand. In one modification palladium acetate and the ionic liquid (bmim)PF6 are immobilized inside the cavities of reversed-phase silica gel. In this way the reaction proceeds in water and the catalyst is re-usable.

Heck oxyarylation 
In the Heck oxyarylation modification the palladium substituent in the syn-addition intermediate is displaced by a hydroxyl group and the reaction product contains a dihydrofuran ring.

Amino-Heck reaction 
In the amino-Heck reaction a nitrogen to carbon bond is formed. In one example, an oxime with a strongly electron withdrawing group reacts intramolecularly with the end of a diene to form a pyridine compound. The catalyst is tetrakis(triphenylphosphine)palladium(0) and the base is triethylamine.

See also 
 Hiyama coupling
 Stille reaction
 Suzuki reaction
 Sonogashira coupling
 Intramolecular Heck reaction
 Negishi Coupling

References

External links 

 The Heck reaction at organic-chemistry.org Article

Carbon-carbon bond forming reactions
Substitution reactions
Palladium
Name reactions